Jaycee John "JoJo" Okwunwanne (born 8 October 1985) is a Nigerian footballer who was naturalized to represent Bahrain internationally and plays as a striker. He started his youth career with Osaka Lagos and was coached by Nigerian exinternational Kingsley Osakwe.

A globetrotter, Thailand is the seventh country Okwunwanne has played in.

Career
Okwunwanne grew up in Lagos, Nigeria, and played for Osaka Lagos. Aged 19, he moved to Bahrain. After a strong fifth season in Bahrain, he went to Belgium to play for Excelsior Mouscron in the top division where he played a solid role.

In December 2009, he became a free agent after his club R.E. Mouscron went into bankruptcy and had to release their players. He went over to sign a one-year contract in Turkey with Eskisehirspor in the Süper Lig.

In January 2011, he transferred to the Kuwaiti Premier League team Al Jahra. Then he joined Qatari club Al Kharitiyat. In 2015, he joined Thai club Bangkok United after spells for Al Kharitiyat and Al-Mesaimeer.

International goals
Scores and results list Bahrain's goal tally first.

References

External links

 
https://us.soccerway.com/players/jaycee-john-akwani/69489/

1985 births
Living people
Igbo sportspeople
Nigerian footballers
Naturalized citizens of Bahrain
Bahraini footballers
Bahrain international footballers
Association football forwards
Royal Excel Mouscron players
Eskişehirspor footballers
Al Jahra SC players
Konyaspor footballers
Al Kharaitiyat SC players
Mesaimeer SC players
Jaycee John Okwunwanne
Belgian Pro League players
Süper Lig players
Jaycee John Okwunwanne
Qatar Stars League players
Qatari Second Division players
Bahraini Premier League players
Kuwait Premier League players
Asian Games competitors for Bahrain
2007 AFC Asian Cup players
2011 AFC Asian Cup players
2015 AFC Asian Cup players
Footballers at the 2006 Asian Games
Nigerian expatriate sportspeople in Kuwait
Expatriate footballers in Kuwait
Nigerian expatriate sportspeople in Bahrain
Nigerian expatriate sportspeople in Qatar
Nigerian expatriate sportspeople in Thailand
Expatriate footballers in Turkey
Expatriate footballers in Belgium
Expatriate footballers in Qatar
Expatriate footballers in Thailand